The following is a list of Montenegrin players in the National Basketball Association (NBA). This list also includes players who were born outside of Montenegro but have represented Montenegro national team.

Key

Players
Note: Statistics are correct as of September 01, 2017.

Drafted but never played

Notes
 Each year is linked to an article about that particular NBA season.
  dissolved in 1992 into five independent countries, Bosnia and Herzegovina, Croatia, Macedonia, Slovenia, and the Federal Republic of Yugoslavia. FR Yugoslavia was renamed into Serbia and Montenegro in February 2003 and dissolved into two independent countries, Montenegro and Serbia, in June 2006.

References

See also
List of foreign NBA players

NBA players
Lists of National Basketball Association players